The 2006 Stanley Cup Finals was the championship series of the National Hockey League's (NHL) 2005–06 season, and the culmination of the 2006 Stanley Cup playoffs. The first Stanley Cup Finals since 2004 after a lockout in 2004 and 2005, it was contested between the Eastern Conference champion Carolina Hurricanes and the Western Conference champion Edmonton Oilers. It was Carolina's second appearance in the Finals, the other being in 2002, a loss to the Detroit Red Wings. It was Edmonton's seventh appearance in the Finals and their first since winning their fifth Stanley Cup in 1990. It was also the first (and to date only) Finals matchup between teams that entered the league in 1979. Carolina defeated Edmonton in seven games to win the franchise's first Stanley Cup and become the tenth post-1967 expansion team and third former WHA team to win the Cup. Carolina's 2006 win was also the team's second league championship (the club, then known as the New England Whalers won the WHA Championship in 1973).

Paths to the Finals

Carolina defeated the Montreal Canadiens 4–2, in the first round of the 2006 Stanley Cup playoffs, the New Jersey Devils 4–1 in the second round and the Buffalo Sabres 4–3 in the Eastern Conference final.

Edmonton defeated the Detroit Red Wings 4–2 in the first round, the San Jose Sharks 4–2  in the second round and the Mighty Ducks of Anaheim 4–1 in the Western Conference final. The Oilers became the first team since the NBA's 1999 New York Knicks and the first team in the history of the NHL to make it to the finals as a #8 seed.

Game summaries
This series marked the first time that two former World Hockey Association teams played against each other for the Stanley Cup since they merged with the NHL in 1979. As a result of the new scheduling formula that was implemented before the 2005–06 NHL season, the Hurricanes and the Oilers did not meet during the regular season.

These were also the first ever finals contested by two teams that had both missed the playoffs the previous season (skipping 2005 due to the lockout). It was also to be the first finals contested by teams that would both go on to miss the following year's playoffs. Prior to these Finals, only the 1938–39 Chicago Blackhawks had ever missed the playoffs one year, then played in the Stanley Cup final (win or lose) the following season, and then missed the playoffs again the season after that. Both the Hurricanes and Oilers have now accomplished this dubious feat.

Hurricanes head coach Peter Laviolette joined Ron Wilson as the only people to have head coached in an Olympics and Stanley Cup finals in the same year, having coached the American ice hockey team during the Torino Olympics. Both would coach in either one in 2010; Wilson coached the American ice hockey team to silver medal at the Vancouver Olympics, while Laviolette would coach in the Stanley Cup Finals with the Philadelphia Flyers.

Game one

In game one, Carolina tied the biggest comeback in Stanley Cup finals history, overcoming a three-goal deficit to win 5–4. Edmonton scored first, 8:18 into the first period, with a goal from Fernando Pisani. In the second period, Chris Pronger scored the first penalty shot goal in finals history after defenceman Niclas Wallin illegally covered the puck inside his own goal crease, and Ethan Moreau's goal at 16:23 gave the Oilers a 3–0 lead. But at the 17:17 mark, Rod Brind'Amour scored the Hurricanes' first goal of the game. Carolina then tied the game in the third period with two scores by Ray Whitney. The Hurricanes jumped ahead 4–3 on a shorthanded breakaway goal by Justin Williams, but Edmonton's Ales Hemsky scored on a power play to tie the game with 6:29 remaining. Late in the final period, Oilers goaltender Dwayne Roloson suffered a series-ending knee injury in a collision and was replaced with Ty Conklin. With 32 seconds remaining in regulation, Conklin misplayed the puck behind his own net, where it deflected off Jason Smith's stick to the front of the empty net, allowing Brind'Amour to score the winning goal. Hurricanes goaltender Cam Ward had to make the last of his 34 saves with 3.8 seconds remaining, robbing Shawn Horcoff for the second time in the third period with a glove save to preserve the victory.

Game two

With Roloson's injury, Jussi Markkanen started for the Oilers in game two. Although Markkanen had played 37 games in the regular season, sharing the job with Ty Conklin and Mike Morrison, he and Conklin switched back and forth during the playoff as the backup (with the other sitting in the press box as a healthy scratch); he also had not played in a game since March 1, 2006. The Hurricanes shut out the Oilers, 5–0, with five different Carolina players scoring goals. It was the first time three goaltenders had been used in a Stanley Cup final since May 1970, when the St. Louis Blues employed Jacques Plante, Glenn Hall and Ernie Wakely on their way to being swept by the Boston Bruins.

Game three

Markkanen once again started in net with Roloson still out. Shawn Horcoff scored just over two minutes into the first period. During the second period, a short-handed goal was waved off by the referee, because he had lost sight of the puck and had blown the whistle, despite the fact that the puck had not yet been covered. The Hurricanes responded midway through the third period with their captain, Rod Brind'Amour, taking a rebound off a blocked shot past Markkanen. However, with 2:15 left in the game, Edmonton's Ryan Smyth scored the winning goal after crashing into Ward inside the crease as they both tried to get control of a rebound off of a shot by Ales Hemsky.

Game four

Edmonton got off to a good start when Sergei Samsonov opened the scoring at 8:40 of the first period. However, the lead was short-lived as Cory Stillman replied just 29 seconds later to tie the game at 1–1. Stillman also made a sound defensive play on Chris Pronger late in the second period, tipping the puck away in the Edmonton zone to the front of the net, where Eric Staal fed a pass to Mark Recchi, who scored the eventual game-winning goal with 4:08 to go in the period. Once again Edmonton's power play was ineffective, failing to capitalize on five chances, including a two-man advantage in the first period. When the game ended, the Oilers were 1-for-25 on the power play to this point in the series.

Game five

Carolina had a 3–1 lead in the series and a chance to win the Stanley Cup on their home ice. However, Edmonton scored first on Fernando Pisani's redirect of a Pronger slapshot 16 seconds into the game. The Hurricanes then went ahead 2–1 on two power play goals by Eric Staal and Ray Whitney before the Oilers scored on the power play with a one-timer by Ales Hemsky to tie the game. Michael Peca then gave Edmonton a 3–2 lead with 17.4 seconds left in the first period. In the second period, Staal poked a goal between Jussi Markkanen and the post to tie the game. Early in the third period, Hurricanes centre Doug Weight got sandwiched by Chris Pronger and Raffi Torres, separating his shoulder and ending his night early. Weight would not return to play for the rest of the series, but would eventually raise the Cup. Carolina defenceman Aaron Ward also was injured in the third period, and with Carolina running out of healthy skaters, the Hurricanes were desperate to close out the game. With 7:47 remaining in the third period, Whitney missed what might have been the Hurricanes' best chance to win the series with a shot that just hit the post. The game went to overtime, where Steve Staios drew a penalty early in the period to put the Hurricanes on the power play. Fernando Pisani picked off a cross-ice pass from Cory Stillman and streaked in short-handed to beat Cam Ward top right corner (glove side) with a left-handed shot to score the first short-handed overtime goal in finals history, giving the Oilers the upset win.

Game six

Despite the emotional boost of Carolina winger Erik Cole returning to the ice for the first time since breaking his neck in March, Edmonton dominated for the entire 60 minutes. They shut out Carolina 4–0, tying the series after down 1–3 in front of a raucous crowd at Rexall Place. They scored three power-play goals and limited the Hurricanes to only 16 shots on goal. Edmonton held Carolina to seven shots through 40 minutes of play. Fernando Pisani scored his post-season-high fifth game-winning goal (and 13th in total, also tops amongst scorers in the 2006 playoffs). This game also marked Jussi Markkanen's first career playoff shutout. This was the final playoff game at Rexall Place, as the Oilers did not make it into playoffs again before moving venues in 2016.

Game seven

However, the Hurricanes returned to the RBC Center to defeat the Oilers in game seven, 3–1, to win the Stanley Cup. Aaron Ward and Frantisek Kaberle gave Carolina a 2–0 lead before Fernando Pisani scored for Edmonton 1:03 into the third period to cut the lead in half.

With just over a minute to go in regulation, the Oilers pulled the goalie in hopes of forcing overtime. A loose puck wound up on the stick of Bret Hedican, who passed to Eric Staal, who himself passed it down-ice to Justin Williams. Williams skated down the length of the ice and tapped the puck into the empty net, sealing the Stanley Cup for the Hurricanes.

Cory Stillman earned a Stanley Cup title for the second-straight season, having won in 2004 with the Tampa Bay Lightning, becoming the first player to win back-to-back titles with different teams since Claude Lemieux (1995 New Jersey Devils, 1996 Colorado Avalanche).

The Hurricanes' victory ended Glen Wesley's 18-year drought without winning the Cup. He had played close to 1,500 regular season and playoff games before winning the Cup, the longest such drought in the NHL. Wesley was the last player remaining from the franchise's days as the Hartford Whalers. Other notable veterans to win their first Cup were Rod Brind'Amour, Doug Weight, Ray Whitney and Bret Hedican. Mark Recchi won the second Cup of his career, having won it 15 years prior as a member of the 1991 Pittsburgh Penguins. He would later retire a Stanley Cup winner with the 2011 Boston Bruins, where he teamed up with Frantisek Kaberle's brother Tomas.

The Hurricanes became the third former World Hockey Association franchise to win the Stanley Cup, following the Oilers and Quebec Nordiques, who won as the Colorado Avalanche in 1996 and 2001.

The 2006 Stanley Cup playoffs marked the second time in a row that an Alberta-based team had made it to the finals only to lose in seven games to the Southeast Division champions, as the Calgary Flames were defeated by the Tampa Bay Lightning in the 2004 Stanley Cup Finals.

This was the first major-league professional championship for the state of North Carolina by a men's team (the Carolina Courage of the defunct Women's United Soccer Association won the 2002 Founders Cup), although the Hurricanes made it to the 2002 Stanley Cup Finals, losing to the Detroit Red Wings in five games; and the Carolina Panthers made it to Super Bowl XXXVIII, but lost to the New England Patriots, and Super Bowl 50, losing to the Denver Broncos. It is also, the only world championship by an active North Carolina based team in any of the four major league sports.

Team rosters
Years indicated in boldface under the "Finals appearance" column signify that the player won the Stanley Cup in the given year.

Carolina Hurricanes

Edmonton Oilers

Stanley Cup engraving
The 2006 Stanley Cup was presented to Hurricanes captain Rod Brind'Amour by NHL Commissioner Gary Bettman following the Hurricanes 3–1 win over the Oilers in game seven.

The following Hurricanes players and staff had their names engraved on the Stanley Cup

2005–06 Carolina Hurricanes

Television
In the United States, this was the first Stanley Cup Finals to be broadcast on NBC and OLN (later Versus, currently NBC Sports Network). Games one and two were on OLN, while the remainder of the series was on NBC. NBC's broadcast of game seven drew a 3.3 rating, a 21% drop from ABC's 4.2 for game seven in 2004. However, some NBC affiliates didn't air game seven live. Overall, NBC had an average rating of 2.3 for its five telecasts of the final, down 12% from ABC's 2004 average.

In Canada, the CBC's broadcast of game seven drew 4.739 million viewers. However, it included pre-game and post-game coverage. The game itself drew 5.553 million.

See also
 2005–06 NHL season
 List of Stanley Cup champions

Notes and references

Notes

References

 
Stanley Cup
Stan
Edmonton Oilers games
Stanley Cup Finals
21st century in Raleigh, North Carolina
Sports competitions in Raleigh, North Carolina
2006 in Alberta
2000s in Edmonton
Ice hockey competitions in Edmonton